Alyaksey Viktaravich Hawrylovich (born 5 January 1990) is a Belarusian professional football player who plays for Russian club Volgar Astrakhan.

Club career
On 10 June 2021, he signed a 2-year contract with Russian Football National League club Chayka Peschanokopskoye.

International career
He played for the Belarus Olympic football team at the 2012 Summer Olympics.

Honours
Naftan Novopolotsk
Belarusian Cup winner: 2011–12

Dinamo Brest
Belarusian Cup winner: 2016–17, 2017–18
Belarusian Super Cup winner: 2018

References

External links

1990 births
Living people
Sportspeople from Pinsk
Belarusian footballers
Association football defenders
Belarus international footballers
Olympic footballers of Belarus
Footballers at the 2012 Summer Olympics
FC Dinamo Minsk players
FC Naftan Novopolotsk players
FC Gomel players
FC Slutsk players
FC Belshina Bobruisk players
FC Dynamo Brest players
FC Okzhetpes players
FC Neman Grodno players
FC Chayka Peschanokopskoye players
FC Volgar Astrakhan players
Belarusian Premier League players
Kazakhstan Premier League players
Russian Second League players
Russian First League players
Belarusian expatriate footballers
Expatriate footballers in Kazakhstan
Belarusian expatriate sportspeople in Kazakhstan
Expatriate footballers in Russia
Belarusian expatriate sportspeople in Russia